James A. Garrity (October 18, 1878 – June 9, 1944) was an American politician from New York.

Life
He was born on October 18, 1878, in Port Griffith, Luzerne County, Pennsylvania. He attended the public schools, and began to work in the local anthracite mines when eleven years old.

In 1902, he moved to Yonkers, New York, and was Chief Probation Officer of the Yonkers City Court from 1902 to 1917. Later he engaged in the insurance business and, in March 1932, he was elected President of the Yonkers Chamber of Commerce.

Garrity was a member of the New York State Senate (26th D.) from 1935 to 1938, sitting in the 158th, 159th, 160th and 161st New York State Legislatures.

He died on June 9, 1944, in Yonkers, New York.

Sources

1878 births
1944 deaths
Democratic Party New York (state) state senators
People from Luzerne County, Pennsylvania
People from Yonkers, New York